Baal, or Baal ( baʿal), was a title and honorific meaning 'owner', 'lord' in the Northwest Semitic languages spoken in the Levant during antiquity. From its use among people, it came to be applied to gods. Scholars previously associated the theonym with solar cults and with a variety of unrelated patron deities, but inscriptions have shown that the name Ba'al was particularly associated with the storm and fertility god Hadad and his local manifestations.

The Hebrew Bible includes use of the term in reference to various Levantine deities, often with application towards Hadad, who was decried as a false god. That use was taken over into Christianity and Islam, sometimes under the form Beelzebub in demonology.

Etymology
The spelling of the English term "Baal" derives from the Greek Báal ( which appears in the New Testament and Septuagint, and from its Latinized form , which appears in the Vulgate. These forms in turn derive from the vowel-less Northwest Semitic form  (Phoenician and ). The word's biblical senses as a Phoenician deity and false gods generally were extended during the Protestant Reformation to denote any idols, icons of the saints, or the Catholic Church generally. In such contexts, it follows the anglicized pronunciation and usually omits any mark between its two As. In close transliteration of the Semitic name, the ayin is represented, as Baʿal.

In the Northwest Semitic languages—Ugaritic, Phoenician, Hebrew, Amorite, and Aramaic—the word baʿal signified 'owner' and, by extension, 'lord', a 'master', or 'husband'. 
Cognates include the Akkadian Bēlu, Amharic bal, and Arabic baʿl. Báʿal and baʿl still serve as the words for 'husband' in modern Hebrew and Arabic respectively. They also appear in some contexts concerning the ownership of things or possession of traits.

The feminine form is baʿalah, meaning 'mistress' in the sense of a female owner or lady of the house and still serving as a rare word for 'wife'.

Suggestions in early modern scholarship also included comparison with the Celtic god Belenus, however this is now widely rejected by contemporary scholars.

Semitic religion

Generic

Like En in Sumerian, the Akkadian bēlu and Northwest Semitic baʿal (as well as its feminine form baʿalah) was used as a title of various deities in the Mesopotamian and Semitic pantheons. Only a definitive article, genitive or epithet, or context could establish which particular god was meant.

Hadad

Baʿal was also used as a proper name by the third millennium BCE, when he appears in a list of deities at Abu Salabikh. Most modern scholarship asserts that this Baʿal—usually distinguished as "The Lord" (Ha Baʿal)—was identical with the storm and fertility god Hadad; it also appears in the form Baʿal Haddu. Scholars propose that, as the cult of Hadad increased in importance, his true name came to be seen as too holy for any but the high priest to speak aloud and the alias "Lord" ("Baʿal") was used instead, as "Bel" was used for Marduk among the Babylonians and "Adonai" for Yahweh among the Israelites. A minority propose that Baʿal was a native Canaanite deity whose cult was identified with or absorbed aspects of Adad's. Regardless of their original relationship, by the 1st millennium BCE, the two were distinct: Hadad was worshipped by the Aramaeans and Baʿal by the Phoenicians and other Canaanites.

El

The Phoenician Baʿal is generally identified with El.

Baʿal

Baʿal is well-attested in surviving inscriptions and was popular in theophoric names throughout the Levant but he is usually mentioned along with other gods, "his own field of action being seldom defined". Nonetheless, Ugaritic records show him as a weather god, with particular power over lightning, wind, rain, and fertility. The dry summers of the area were explained as Baʿal's time in the underworld and his return in autumn was said to cause the storms which revived the land. Thus, the worship of Baʿal in Canaan—where he eventually supplanted El as the leader of the gods and patron of kingship—was connected to the regions' dependence on rainfall for its agriculture, unlike Egypt and Mesopotamia, which focused on irrigation from their major rivers. Anxiety about the availability of water for crops and trees increased the importance of his cult, which focused attention on his role as a rain god. He was also called upon during battle, showing that he was thought to intervene actively in the world of man, unlike the more aloof El. The Lebanese city of Baalbeck was named after Baal.

The Baʿal of Ugarit was the epithet of Hadad but as the time passed, the epithet became the god's name while Hadad became the epithet. Baʿal was usually said to be the son of Dagan, but appears as one of the sons of El in Ugaritic sources. Both Baʿal and El were associated with the bull in Ugaritic texts, as it symbolized both strength and fertility. He held special enmity against snakes, both on their own and as representatives of Yammu ( "Sea"), the Canaanite sea god and river god. He fought the Tannin (Tunnanu), the "Twisted Serpent" (Bṭn ʿqltn), "Lotan the Fugitive Serpent" (Ltn Bṭn Brḥ, the biblical Leviathan), and the "Mighty One with Seven Heads" (Šlyṭ D.šbʿt Rašm). Baʿal's conflict with Yammu is now generally regarded as the prototype of the vision recorded in the 7th chapter of the biblical Book of Daniel. As vanquisher of the sea, Baʿal was regarded by the Canaanites and Phoenicians as the patron of sailors and sea-going merchants. As vanquisher of Mot, the Canaanite death god, he was known as Baʿal Rāpiʾuma (Bʿl Rpu) and regarded as the leader of the Rephaim (Rpum), the ancestral spirits, particularly those of ruling dynasties.

From Canaan, worship of Baʿal spread to Egypt by the Middle Kingdom and throughout the Mediterranean following the waves of Phoenician colonization in the early 1st millennium BCE. He was described with diverse epithets and, before Ugarit was rediscovered, it was supposed that these referred to distinct local gods. However, as explained by Day, the texts at Ugarit revealed that they were considered "local manifestations of this particular deity, analogous to the local manifestations of the Virgin Mary in the Roman Catholic Church". In those inscriptions, he is frequently described as "Victorious Baʿal" (Aliyn or ẢlỈyn Baʿal), "Mightiest one" (Aliy or ʿAly) or "Mightiest of the Heroes" (Aliy Qrdm), "The Powerful One" (Dmrn), and in his role as patron of the city "Baʿal of Ugarit" (Baʿal Ugarit). As Baʿal Zaphon (Baʿal Ṣapunu), he was particularly associated with his palace atop Jebel Aqra (the ancient Mount Ṣapānu and classical Mons Casius). He is also mentioned as "Winged Baʿal" (Bʿl Knp) and "Baʿal of the Arrows" (Bʿl Ḥẓ). Phoenician and Aramaic inscriptions describe Bʿl Krntryš, "Baʿal of the Lebanon" (Bʿl Lbnn), "Baʿal of Sidon" (Bʿl Ṣdn), Bʿl Ṣmd, "Baʿal of the Heavens" (Baʿal Shamem or Shamayin), Baʿal ʾAddir (Bʿl ʾdr), Baʿal Hammon (Baʿal Ḥamon), Bʿl Mgnm.

Baʿal Hammon

Baʿal Hammon was worshipped in the Tyrian colony of Carthage as their supreme god. It is believed that this position developed in the 5th century BCE following the severing of its ties to Tyre following the 480 BCE Battle of Himera. Like Hadad, Baʿal Hammon was a fertility god. Inscriptions about Punic deities tend to be rather uninformative, though, and he has been variously identified as a moon god and as Dagan, the grain god. Rather than the bull, Baʿal Hammon was associated with the ram and depicted with his horns. The archaeological record seems to bear out accusations in Roman sources that the Carthaginians burned their children as human sacrifices to him. He was worshipped as Baʿal Karnaim ("Lord of the Two Horns"), particularly at an open-air sanctuary at Jebel Bu Kornein ("Two-Horn Hill") across the bay from Carthage. His consort was the goddess Tanit.

The epithet Hammon is obscure. Most often, it is connected with the NW Semitic ḥammān ("brazier") and associated with a role as a sun god. Renan and Gibson linked it to Hammon (modern Umm el-‘Amed between Tyre in Lebanon and Acre in Israel) and Cross and Lipiński to Haman or Khamōn, the classical Mount Amanus and modern Nur Mountains, which separate northern Syria from southeastern Cilicia.

Judaism

Baʿal (בַּעַל) appears about 90 times in the Hebrew Bible in reference to various gods. The priests of the Canaanite Baʿal are mentioned numerous times, most prominently in the First Book of Kings. Many scholars believe that this describes Jezebel's attempt to introduce the worship of the Baʿal of Tyre, Melqart, to the Israelite capital Samaria in the 9th century BCE. Against this, Day argues that Jezebel's Baʿal was more probably Baʿal Shamem, the Lord of the Heavens, a title most often applied to Hadad, who is also often titled just Ba‘al.

1 Kings 18 records an account of a contest between the prophet Elijah and Jezebel's priests. Both sides offered a sacrifice to their respective gods: Ba'al failed to light his followers' sacrifice while Yahweh's heavenly fire burnt Elijah's altar to ashes, even after it had been soaked with water. The observers then followed Elijah's instructions to slay the priests of Baʿal, after which it began to rain, showing Yahweh's mastery over the weather.

Other references to the priests of Baʿal describe their burning of incense in prayer and their offering of sacrifice while adorned in special vestments.

Yahweh

The title baʿal was a synonym in some contexts of the Hebrew adon ("Lord") and adonai ("My Lord") still used as aliases of the Lord of Israel Yahweh. According to some scholars, the early Hebrews did use the names Baʿal ("Lord") and Baʿali ("My Lord") in reference to the Lord of Israel, just as Baʿal farther north designated the Lord of Ugarit or Lebanon. This occurred both directly and as the divine element of some Hebrew theophoric names. However, according to others it is not certain that the name Baal was definitely applied to Yahweh in early Israelite history. The component Baal in proper names is mostly applied to worshippers of Baal, or descendants of the worshippers of Baal. Names including the element Baʿal presumably in reference to Yahweh include the judge Gideon (also known as Jerubaʿal,  "The Lord Strives"), Saul's son Eshbaʿal ("The Lord is Great"), and David's son Beeliada ("The Lord Knows"). The name Bealiah ("The Lord is Jah"; "Yahweh is Baʿal") combined the two. However John Day states that as far as the names Eshba’al, Meriba’al, and Beeliada (that is Baaliada), are concerned it is not certain whether they simply allude to the Canaanite god Ba’al, or are intended to equate Yahweh with Ba’al, or have no connection to Ba’al.

It was the program of Jezebel, in the 9th century BCE, to introduce into Israel's capital city of Samaria her Phoenician worship of Baal as opposed to the worship of Yahweh that made the name anathema to the Israelites.
 Eshbaʿal became Ish-bosheth and Meribaʿal became Mephibosheth, but other possibilities also occurred. Gideon's name Jerubaʿal was mentioned intact but glossed as a mockery of the Canaanite god, implying that he strove in vain. Direct use of Baʿali continued at least as late as the time of the prophet Hosea, who reproached the Israelites for doing so.

Brad E. Kelle has suggested that references to cultic sexual practices in the worship of Baal, in Hosea 2, are evidence of an historical situation in which Israelites were either giving up Yahweh worship for Baal, or blending the two.  Hosea's references to sexual acts being metaphors for Israelite "apostasy".

Baʿal Berith

Baʿal Berith ("Lord of the Covenant") was a god worshipped by the Israelites when they "went astray" after the death of Gideon according to the Hebrew Scriptures. The same source relates that Gideon's son Abimelech went to his mother's kin at Shechem and received 70 shekels of silver "from the House of Baʿal Berith" to assist in killing his 70 brothers from Gideon's other wives. An earlier passage had made Shechem the scene of Joshua's covenant between all the tribes of Israel and "El Yahweh, our god of Israel" and a later one describes it as the location of the "House of El Berith". It is thus unclear whether the false worship of the "Baʿalim" being decried is the worship of a new idol or rites and teachings placing Yahweh as a mere local god within a larger pantheon. The Hebrew Scriptures record the worship of Baʿal threatening Israel from the time of the Judges until the monarchy. However, during the period of Judges such worship seems to have been an occasional deviation from a deeper and more constant worship of Yahweh:

The Deuteronomist and the present form of Jeremiah seem to phrase the struggle as monolatry or monotheism against polytheism. Yahweh is frequently identified in the Hebrew scriptures with El Elyon, however, this was after a conflation with El in a process of religious syncretism. ’El became a generic term meaning "god", as opposed to the name of a worshipped deity, and epithets such as El Shaddai came to be applied to Yahweh alone, while Baal's nature as a storm and weather god became assimilated into Yahweh's own identification with the storm. In the next stage the Yahwistic religion separated itself from its Canaanite heritage, first by rejecting Baal-worship in the 9th century, then through the 8th to 6th centuries with prophetic condemnation of Baal, sun-worship, worship on the "high places", practices pertaining to the dead, and other matters.

Beelzebub

Baʿal Zebub ( "Fly Lord") occurs in the first chapter of the Second Book of Kings as the name of the Philistine god of Ekron. In it, Ahaziah, king of Israel, is said to have consulted the priests of Baʿal Zebub as to whether he would survive the injuries from his recent fall. The prophet Elijah, incensed at this impiety, then foretold that he would die quickly, raining heavenly fire on the soldiers sent to punish him for doing so. Jewish scholars have interpreted the title of "Lord of the Flies" as the Hebrew way of calling Baʿal a pile of dung and his followers vermin, although others argue for a link to power over causing and curing pestilence and thus suitable for Ahaziah's question. The Septuagint renders the name as Baälzeboúb and as "Baʿal of Flies" (Baäl muian). Symmachus the Ebionite rendered it as Beëlzeboúl, possibly reflecting its original sense. This has been proposed to have been B‘l Zbl, Ugaritic for "Prince Baal".

Classical sources
Outside of Jewish and Christian contexts, the various forms of Baʿal were indifferently rendered in classical sources as Belus (Bē̂los). An example is Josephus, who states that Jezebel "built a temple to the god of the Tyrians, which they call Belus"; this describes the Baʿal of Tyre, Melqart. Herrmann identifies the Demarus/Demarous figure mentioned by Philo Byblius as Baʿal.

Baʿal Hammon, however, was identified with the Greek Cronos and the Roman Saturn as the Zabul Saturn. He was probably never equated with Melqart, although this assertion appears in older scholarship.

Christianity
Beelzebub or Beelzebul was identified by the writers of the New Testament as Satan, "prince" (i.e., king) of the demons.

John Milton's 1667 epic Paradise Lost describes the fallen angels collecting around Satan, stating that, though their heavenly names had been "blotted out and ras'd", they would acquire new ones "wandring ore the Earth" as false gods. Baalim and Ashtaroth are given as the collective names of the male and female demons (respectively) who came from between the "bordering flood of old Euphrates" and "the Brook that parts Egypt from Syrian ground".

Baal and derived epithets like Baalist were used as slurs during the English Reformation for the saints and their devotees.

Islam
The Quran mentions that Prophet Elias (Elijah) warned his people against Baʿal worship.

According to Tabari, baal is a term used by Arabs to denote everything which is a lord over anything.

Al-Thaʿlabī offers a more detailed description about Baal; accordingly it was an idol of gold, twenty cubits tall, and had four faces.

See also

 Adonis
 Baal (disambiguation)
 Baal in popular culture
 Baal the demon
 Baalahs
 Baʿal Peʿor (Lord of Mt Peʿor)
 Baal-zephon (Lord of Mount Zaphon)
 Baaltars
 Bel and Temple of Bel
 Beluses
 Belial
 Dyēus
 Elagabalus
 Set
 Teshub and Theispas

Notes

References

Citations

Sources

 
 
 
 
 
 
 
 
 
 
 
 
  
 
 
 
 . 
 
 

	
 
 
 
 
 , translated from the German for Routledge in 1987 as The Routledge Dictionary of Gods and Goddesses, Devils and Demons

Further reading

External links

 
 Jewish Encyclopedia (1901–1906) "Ba'al", "Ba'al and Ba'al Worship", "Baal-Berith", "Baal-Peor", "Baalim", "Astarte Worship among the Hebrews", &c., Jewish Encyclopedia, New York: Funk & Wagnalls

 
Books of Kings
Carthaginian mythology
Deities in the Hebrew Bible
Elijah
Fertility gods
Noble titles
Phoenician mythology
Rain deities
West Semitic gods
Names of God in Judaism
Religion in ancient Israel and Judah
Harvest gods
Ugaritic deities
Thunder gods
Children of El (deity)